Mycobacterium obuense is a species of soil-dwelling scotochromogenic Mycobacterium. The cell wall of M. obuense contains 1-tetradecanol, 2-octadecanol, and 2-eicosanol, and triacylated lipoproteins.

Use in immunomodulatory therapy
Preparations of heat-killed Mycobacterium obuense (such as IMM-101) are immunomodulatory and have been used to direct the immune response in the treatment of cancers - notably pancreatic cancer and malignant melanoma. Recent trials have been directed towards the treatment of colorectal cancer. It has been shown that human myeloid dendritic cells, (antigen-presenting cells that serve as a bridge linking the adaptive and innate immune system), can detect mycobacterial triacylated lipoproteins via TLR2 and TLR1.

References

External links
Type strain of Mycobacterium obuense at BacDive -  the Bacterial Diversity Metadatabase

Acid-fast bacilli
obuense